List of Arabic language poets, most of whom were or are Arabs and who wrote in the Arabic language. Each year links to the corresponding "[year] in poetry" article. The alphabetical order is by first names.

Alphabetical list


A
Abbas Al Akkad (1889–1964)
Abbas Ibn al-Ahnaf (750–809) (عباس بن الأحنف)
Abdallah Zrika (1953)
Abd Al-Rahman Abnudi (b. 1938)
Abd al-Rahman al-Fazazi (d. 1230)
Abd Al-Rahman Shokry  (1886–1958)
Abd al-Wahhab Al-Bayyati (1926–1999)
Abdelaziz al-Malzuzi (d. 1298)
Abdel Latif Moubarak (b. 1964)
Abdel Mohsin Musellem (b.1958)
Abderrahman El Majdoub (d. 1568)
Abdul Rahman Yusuf (b. 1970)
Abdullah ibn al-Mu'tazz (861–908)
Abo Al Qassim Al Shabbi 
Abu 'Afak (7th Century)
Abu al-Faraj al-Isfahani (897–967)
Abu al-Hasan al-Shushtari (1212-1269)
Abu Nuwas (750–813)
Abu Tammam (c. 805–845)
Abu-l-'Atahiya (748–828)
Ahmad al-Tifashi (d. 1253)
Ahmed Shawqi (1868–1932)
al-Akhtal (c. 640–710)
Maymun Ibn Qays Al-a'sha (570–625)
al-Buhturi (820–897)
al-Farazdaq (d. c. 729)
al-Fath ibn Khaqan (817–861)
Adunis (b. 1928–)
Ali Al Jallawi (b. 1975–)
'Ali ibn Muhammad al-Busiri (d. 1296)
al-Khansa (600–670)
Abu ibn Abd Allah al-Ma'arri (973–1057)
Al-Mutanabbi (915–965)
al-Nabighah al-Dhubyani (6th century)
'Alqama ibn 'Abada (6th century)
Al-Rabi ibn Abu al-Huqayq (7th Century)
al-Walid ibn Yazid, (d. 744)
Amr ibn Kulthum (6th century)
'Antara Ibn Shaddad (d. c. 580)
Asma bint Marwan

B
Badawi al-Jabal, (b. 1907)
Badi' al-Zaman al-Hamadhani (967–1007)
Badr Shakir al-Sayyab, (d. 1964)
Bashar ibn Burd (714–784)
Bashir Copti, (1929- ) (بشير عيسى قبطي)
Bhai Nand Lal (1633–1713)- composed mainly in Urdu and Persian

F
Fadwa Toukan (1917–2003)
Francis Marrash (1836–1873)

H
Hafiz Ibrahim (1872–1932)
Harith Ibn Hilliza Ul-Yashkuri
Hassan ibn Thabit (d. c. 674)
Hilmi M. Zawati (b.1953) (حلمي زواتي)

I
Ibn al-Farid (1181–1235
Ibn al-Khatib (1313-1374)
Ibn al-Rumi, (d. 896)
Muhyi al-din ibn al-'Arabi, (d. 1240)
Ibn Duraid (837–934)
Ibn Juzayy (1321–1340)
Ibn Khafajah, (b. 1039)
Ibn Quzman (1078–1160)
Ibn Sahl of Sevilla (1212–1251)
Ibn Zaydún (1003–1071)
Ibrahim Al-Mausili (742–804)
Ibrahim Nagi (1898–1953)
Ibrahim Touqan (1905–1941
Iliyya Abu Madi, (d. 1957)
Iman Mersal
Imru' al-Qais (6th century)
Ismail ibn Yasar al-Nisai

J
Jabal ibn Jawwal (7th Century)
Jamal Jumá (b. 1956)
Jamil Sidqi al-Zahawi, (d. 1936)
Jarir ibn `Atiyah al-Khatfi (d. c. 728)

K
Ka'b bin Zuhayr (6th century)
Kahlil Gibran (1883- 1931)
Khalil ibn Ahmad (718–791)
Khalil Mutran (d. 1949)
Kumait Ibn Zaid (679–743)
Kuthayyir (ca. 660-ca. 723)

L
Labīd (560–661)
Layla al-Akhyaliyyah, (d. 704)

M
Mahjoub Sharif (1948-2014)
Mahmoud Darwish (1941–2008)
Mahmud Sami al-Barudi (d. 1904)
Mana Al Otaiba, (b. 1946)
Mansur al-Hallaj (d. 922)
Maram al-Masri (b. 1962) 
Maryana Marrash (1848–1919)
Masoud Juni (1938-1991)
Mohamed Ghozzi (20th century)
Mohammed Abdalbari (b. 1985)
Mohammed Bennis (1948-)
Mohammed ibn Qasim ibn Zakur (d. 1708)
Mourid Barghouti (b. 1944)
Muhammad bin Hani al Andalusi al Azdi, (d. 973)
Muhammad Ibn Abbad Al Mutamid (1040–1095)
Muhammad ibn Ammar (c. 1031–1086) 
Muhammad Mahdi Al-Jawahiri, (d. 1998)
Muhammad Tahir ul-Qadri
Muhammed Almagut (1934–2006)

N
Najma Idrees
Nazik Al-Malaika (1923-2007)
Nizar Qabbani (1923–1998)

Q
Qassim Haddad (b. 1948)
Qays ibn al-Mullawah, (d. 688)

S
Saadi Youssef (1934–2021)
Said Akl (1911-2014)
Salah Jaheen (1930–1986)
Salman Masalha (b. 1953)
Samaw'al ibn 'Adiya (d. c. 560)
Samih al-Qasim, (20th century)
Sidi Boushaki (1394–1453)

T
Tarafah ibn al 'Abd (6th century)

U
'Umar Abu Rishah (b. 1910)
Umar Ibn Abi Rabi'ah (d. 712)

W
Waddah al-Yaman (d. 708)
Wallada bint al-Mustakfi (994–1091)

Z
Zuhayr ibn Abī Sūlmā (520–609)

See also
 Arabic literature
 Modern Arabic literature
 Arabic poetry

 
 
 
Arabic